The Southern Māori by-election of 1967 was a by-election for the electorate of Southern Maori on 11 March 1967 during the 35th New Zealand Parliament. The by-election resulted from the death of the previous member Sir Eruera Tirikatene on 11 January 1967.

The by-election was won by his daughter Whetu Tirikatene (later Whetu Tirikatene-Sullivan), also of the Labour Party.

Candidates
Labour

As Te Rino was part-Maori and entitled to choose between being on the Maori and European electoral rolls, at the time of the by-election he was registered on the European roll in Rangiora where he had to remain under the electoral act until the next general election, which made it unlikely he would be eligible as a candidate in Southern Maori. With Te Rino effectively ruled out, attention turned to Tirikatene's daughter Whetu (who was studying in Australia at the time) as the likely Labour candidate for the seat. The Labour Party eventually chose Whetu Tirikatene as its candidate.

National
Flight Lieutenant Mafeking Baden Powell Pere was chosen by the National Party. He was a jet pilot in the Royal New Zealand Air Force based at Wigram Aerodrome. Pere had contested the Southern Maori seat in the previous election.

Social Credit
The Social Credit Party selected James Hugh MacDonald, a lineman from Blenheim as its candidate. He had contested the Southern Maori seat at the 1966 election.

Results
The following table gives the election results:

Tirikatene was elected with a huge majority, becoming the youngest woman to have been elected to Parliament to that time. Contrary to normal trends the candidate from the incumbent party increased their vote and majority. Leader of the Opposition Norman Kirk said he was encouraged by the result due to the swing to Labour being consistent across the electorate, which covered the area of 40 general seats, many of which were marginal.

Notes

References

Southern Maori 1967
1967 elections in New Zealand
Māori politics
March 1967 events in New Zealand